Tappeh Lari or Tappeh Lori may refer to:
 Tappeh Lari, Kermanshah
 Tappeh Lori, Ravansar, Kermanshah Province